Anna Diogenissa (ca. 1074–1145) was a Byzantine noblewoman of the Diogenes house who became the Grand Princess consort of Serbia as wife of Uroš I Vukanović (r. 1112–1145). She had five children with Uroš I, including the successor, Uroš II (r. 1145–1162).

Life
Anna Diogenissa was born in the Byzantine capital Constantinople the year after the death of her father Constantine Diogenes at Antioch in 1074.<ref name="Cawley">Cawley, Charles (2010). Medieval Lands, Byzantium, Diogenes, Emperor 1068-1071</ref> Her mother was Theodora Komnene, a daughter of the powerful noblewoman Anna Dalassena and John Komnenos, and hence sister to the future emperor Alexios I Komnenos (r. 1081–1118). Her paternal grandparents were Romanos IV Diogenes (r. 1068–1071) and Anna of Bulgaria.

It is not recorded when Anna married Uroš I, the Serbian Grand Prince, who reigned from ca. 1112 to 1145. It most likely took place during Urošʻs captivity in Byzantium, where he had been sent as a hostage by his uncle Vukan following the capture of Lipljan in 1094 by the troops of Alexios I Komnenos. Uroš is credited with having unified most of the Serbian territories after retaking them from Byzantine occupation. Rascia was the first independent state of the Serbs which had been formed in the 8th century.

Together they had at least five children: 
Uroš II, Grand Prince of Serbia 
 Desa (d. after 1166)
Beloš
Helena, Queen of Hungary and Croatia (d. after 1146), married King Béla II of Hungary
 Marija, married Conrad II, Grand Duke of Znojmo, mother of Helen of Znojmo
Possible child of Anna and Uroš:
Zavida, Lord of Ribnica

There is not much information in the available sources on the life of Anna, and this lack includes the date of her death. Charles Cawley in his Medieval Lands derived what little information he has from Europäische Stammtafeln''.

See also
List of Serbian consorts

References

|-

11th-century births
12th-century deaths
12th-century Byzantine women
11th-century Byzantine women
12th-century Serbian women
12th-century Serbian royalty
People of the Grand Principality of Serbia
Anna
Medieval Serbian royal consorts
People from Constantinople
Medieval Serbian people of Greek descent